Lieutenant Robert Dale (1810–20 July 1853) was the first European explorer to cross the Darling Range in Western Australia.

Robert Dale was born in Winchester, England in November 1810, son of Major Thurston Dale and Helen Matthews. Through the influence of his great-uncle General William Dyott, on 25 October 1827 he was appointed an ensign in the British Army's 63rd Regiment of Foot. On arrival at the colony, he was seconded as an assistant to Surveyor General John Septimus Roe, whose Survey Department was suffering under an extreme workload. Dale spent four years with the Survey Department, surveying, clearing roads and exploring. He was the first European to cross the Darling Range, where he discovered the fertile Avon Valley and explored the future locations of Northam, Toodyay and York. He was also the first European to see and describe the numbat.

In November 1832 Dale purchased a vacated lieutenancy, but the following year returned to England.  He took with him the smoked head of Yagan, a Noongar Aboriginal who had been ambushed and killed by a young settler. He remained on leave until he sold his commission in 1835. The sale of his commission, along with £500 inherited from his grandfather, who had died in January 1835, enabled Dale to set himself up as a timber merchant in Liverpool in November 1835. He became involved in promoting the use of the Western Australian timber jarrah.  He died of tuberculosis in Bath on 20 July 1853.

Mount Dale, one of the highest points in the Darling Range, to the south of Mundaring Weir, is named after him. The Dale River, a tributary of the Avon River, is also named after him, as is Ensign Dale Place in Northam, Western Australia.

The Panoramic View of King George's Sound, Part of the Colony of Swan River, a  hand-coloured aquatint panorama of Albany after sketches by Dale, was published in 1834 by Robert Havell.

References

Further reading

 
 
 

1809 births
1853 deaths
19th-century deaths from tuberculosis
English explorers
Explorers of Western Australia
63rd Regiment of Foot officers
Tuberculosis deaths in England